Traveller Supplement Adventure 7: Broadsword is a 1982 role-playing game adventure for Traveller published by Game Designers' Workshop.

Plot summary
Broadsword is an adventure which focuses on the 800-ton Broadsword mercenary cruiser class of ships.

Reception
William A. Barton reviewed Broadsword in The Space Gamer No. 52. Barton commented that "Broadsword should prove an enjoyable Traveller adventure, especially to players who are militarily-inclined."

Reviews
 Different Worlds #23 (Aug., 1982)

References

Role-playing game supplements introduced in 1982
Traveller (role-playing game) adventures